Jackie Kong is an American screenwriter, film producer, and film director known for the cult horror film Blood Diner.

Biography 
Jackie Kong began her foray in Horror Comics 2022, adding Comic Book Creator to her list of accomplishments. Ms. Kong delivered Issue #1 of “Spend The Night” to Kickstarter Backers who funded the first book in October 2021. Kong wrote 20 Issues during the pandemic to be produced through Kong Comics. Issue #2 is in the works September 2022. Kong will make appearances in NYC October 2022 at NY Comic Con, and signing at Forbidden Planet to kick off the national release of “Spend the Night” Issue #1- “The Curse of One-Eyed Jenny” to Comic Book stores nationwide.  Kong was born in Hanford, California and grew up in Benedict Canyon above Beverly Hills. Kong has four sisters and one brother. She and her mother moved to Hollywood when Jackie was 16 so her mother, Anita Loo, could pursue a career as an actress. Her mother was a cinephile, and Kong was exposed at a young age to the world of film. In a recent interview on a podcast called Shock Waves, Kong recalls receiving her first 16mm film camera from her mother's good friend Marlon Brando for her 18th birthday. Marlon did however try to talk her out of the world of cinema because of all the stigma and pressures of the Hollywood scene. Despite the reluctant support from Brando and her parents, Kong went on to become a successful director and cult film extraordinaire Kong attended Beverly Hills High School, where she started making short films, and later graduated from California State University Northridge.

Kong produces, writes and directs films that are often inventive, shocking, and funny. Throughout the eighties, Kong made many low-budget films and began doing so in her early 20s. She made her first film at the age of 23. Her first film debut was with the killer toxic mutant monster horror feature The Being, starring José Ferrer, Ruth Buzzi, Dorothy Malone, and Martin Landau. Kong next made the film Night Patrol, starring Linda Blair, Murray "The Unknown Comic" Langston, and Pat Paulsen. Both "The Being" and "Night Patrol" were produced by Kong's husband at the time, Bill Osco. Her next film was the extremely gory "Blood Diner," which was a tribute to the notorious Herschell Gordon Lewis horror film, Blood Feast.

Jackie Kong briefly resurfaced in 2001 when directing and producing episodes of the short-lived TV series "Karaoke Nights." Her films such as “Blood Diner”  have developed a "cult " following which contribute greatly to her maintaining relevance in film.

Her last movie to date was "The Underachievers," as she was only able to complete two films of her three-picture deal due to Vestron (the video company) going out of business. More recently, she has worked as a speaker and guest of many film festivals and became the Executive Director of a non-profit organization called Asian American Media Development.

In recent years, Kong has launched a website where she addresses rumors about herself, she has attended many screenings of her films, she recorded audio commentaries for re-releases of her movies, and she’s currently working on a new project. Published on October 10, 2020, in an interview with journalist Christian Genzel in his interview series, Talking Pictures, Jackie talks about the making of “Blood Diner,” her aesthetic and her characters. Despite her films being produced in the 80s, they still have large followings and hold people's interest, making them all very relevant today.

Kong's active website is called jackiekongdirector.com, where all of her work is listed, along with recent videos/interviews she is featured in. She was featured on The CULTSHOW on youtube on March 15, 2020 to discuss her films “Blood Diner” and “Night Patrol” and streamed live with them on April 3, 2020 as well.
Jackie Kong appeared as a guest on "Creature Features" twice in 2020 & 2021.

Filmography 
The Being (1983)
Night Patrol (1984)
The Underachievers (1987)
Blood Diner (1987)
Karaoke Nights (2001) (TV series)
In Search of Darkness: Part II (2020) (Documentary)
 "Creature Features" (2020 & 2021)

References

External links
 Official website

Living people
American film producers
American film directors
American women screenwriters
American women film directors
Chinese women film directors
American women film producers
California State University, Northridge alumni
Beverly Hills High School alumni
1957 births
21st-century American women